The 1961 All-Ireland Senior Camogie Championship was the high point of the 1961 season in Camogie. The championship was won by Dublin who defeated Tipperary by a ten-point margin in the final.

Championship
The practice of giving Dublin a bye into the Leinster final was ended in 1961 and they had to play Wexford in a first round championship match. Judy Doyle scored three goals for Dublin on her inter-county debut as Dublin beat Laois by 8-4 to 2-1 to win the Leinster title at Parnell Park. Judy Doyle scored another three goals for Dublin against Galway in the semi-final and Una O’Connor two. Tipperary defeated Cork by 3-0 to 0-1 to win the Munster title at Clonmel with two goals by Kathleen Downes and a third by Kathleen Griffin. Antrim missed their full back Moya Forde from the All Ireland semi-final, a factor in Tipperary's morale-boosting win in Casment Park during which Kathleen Downes scored three goals, Tess Moloney two and Terry Cummins the sixth.

Final
Tipperary trailed by just one point at half-time but lost by ten. Agnes Hourigan wrote in the Irish Press:  Dublin kept the trophy because of their better team work and crafty combination and yet this was a game in which Tipperary were not far behind the victors. Tipperary were by far the longer strikers and in the first half their forward looked more dangerous but failed to combine. Just before the interval Kathleen Downes left Tipperary supporters happy with a goal which left a point between the sides. Thought now against the wind, Dublin stretched the lead by 1-1 at the start of the second half. Although Tipp fought back, Dublin’s teamwork now proved decisive. After Kathleen Mills had put Dublin on the way to victory with a goal, Judy Doyle negated a Tipp goal with a similar score for Dublin. Brídie Scully was Tipperary’s star, playing first on the left wing, then switching to left back midway through the first half and ending up in her customary position of centre back in the second half.

Kathleen Mills retires
It was Kathleen Mills last match for Dublin. Agnes Hourigan wrote in the Irish Press: Kathleen Mills, the most famed camogie player of all time, bade farewell to the game in a blaze of glory at Croke Park where she played a big part in Dublin’s victory. Kathleen won her 15th All-Ireland medal, an achievement unequalled in any team tame. No wonder the crowd cheered the blonde winger from CIE club when, carrying the O’Duffy Cup, she was chaired by her team mates.

Final stages

 
MATCH RULES
50 minutes
Replay if scores level
Maximum of 3 substitutions

See also
 All-Ireland Senior Hurling Championship
 Wikipedia List of Camogie players
 National Camogie League
 Camogie All Stars Awards
 Ashbourne Cup

References

External links
 Camogie Association
 Historical reports of All Ireland finals
 All-Ireland Senior Camogie Championship: Roll of Honour
 Camogie on facebook
 Camogie on GAA Oral History Project

All-Ireland Senior Camogie Championship
1961
All-Ireland Senior Camogie Championship
All-Ireland Senior Camogie Championship